HNLMS Marten Harpertszoon Tromp was a unique coastal defence ship of the Royal Netherlands Navy built by the Rijkswerf in Amsterdam.

Design

The main armament of the ships were two  single turret guns. Secondary armament included four single  guns and eight  single guns.

Service history
Tromp was launched on 15 June 1904 at the Rijkswerf in Amsterdam. On 5 April 1906 she was commissioned by Captain Koster as the first commander of the ship. The same year on 25 June she made a visit to Norway for an official visit to the ship by Haakon VII of Norway.

On 2 March 1920 she and  departed from Den Helder for a four month journey to Asia to show the flag. They visited the ports of Singapore, Saigon, Hong Kong, Shanghai, Kobe and Manila.

On 17 November 1923, the Dutch cargo ship  put into port at Bastia, Corsica, France, on fire. Marten Harpertszoon Tromp scuttled the burning ship.

During the trip they visited the ports of Kiel, Göteborg and Trondheim.

The ship was decommissioned in 1927.

Notes

References

External links

Description of ship

Coastal defence ships of the Royal Netherlands Navy
1904 ships
Ships built in Amsterdam
Maritime incidents in 1923